María Paulina Pérez García (born 10 January 1996) is a Colombian professional tennis player.

On 12 September 2022, she reached her best singles ranking of world No. 619. On 6 March 2023, she peaked at No. 142 in the WTA doubles rankings.
Pérez has won one doubles title on the WTA Tour and 12 doubles titles on the ITF Women's Circuit.

Pérez made her WTA Tour debut at the 2013 Copa Colsanitas, partnering her sister Paula Andrea in doubles. The twins lost their first-round match against Alizé Cornet and Pauline Parmentier.

Ranked No. 273, at a career high in doubles, she reached her first WTA Tour final at the 2023 Monterrey Open, partnering Yuliana Lizarazo. They won their maiden title defeating Kimberly Birrell and Fernanda Contreras Gómez. As a result, she moved up 130 positions in the doubles rankings into the top 150.

Playing for Colombia Fed Cup team, Pérez has a win–loss record of 2–11 in Fed Cup competition.

WTA career finals

Doubles: 1 (title)

ITF Circuit finals

Singles: 2 (2 runner–ups)

Doubles: 29 (12 titles, 17 runner-ups)

Notes

References

External links
 
 
 

1996 births
Living people
Sportspeople from Barranquilla
Colombian female tennis players
Twin sportspeople
Colombian twins
Central American and Caribbean Games medalists in tennis
Central American and Caribbean Games gold medalists for Colombia
20th-century Colombian women
21st-century Colombian women